Corax can refer to:

Biology
 Corax, the scientific species name of the common raven (Corvus corax)
 Corax, a species name
 Corax (genus), a genus of fossil sharks

People
 Corax of Syracuse, one of the founders of Greek rhetoric
 Predrag Koraksić Corax,  political cartoonist from Serbia
 Janne Corax (born 1967), Swedish cyclist

Fictional people 
Corax, central character in The Gospel of Corax, 1996 Paul Park novel
Corvus Corax, Primarch of the Raven Guard Legion in the universe of Warhammer 40,000

Other uses
 BAE Systems Corax (also known as the 'Raven'), a British experimental unmanned aerial vehicle developed in 2004
 "Corax", abbreviation of corporate action in the realm of corporate finance

See also
 Including use as a species name
 Corex cough syrup